Richard Bayha (15 March 1929 – 3 November 1993) was a German politician of the Christian Democratic Union (CDU) and former member of the German Bundestag.

Life 
Bayha, who joined the CDU in 1954, was chairman of the agricultural policy committee of the Hessian state association from 1972. From 1987 until his death, he was chairman of the Federal Committee on Agricultural Policy of the federal party.

Bayha was a municipal representative in Altenhaßlau from 1956 to 1968. From 1964 to 1974 he was a member of the district council of Gelnhausen. From 1970 to 1976 he was a member of the Hessian State Parliament, where he was Chairman of the Committee for Agriculture and Forestry from 1974 to 1976. In 1976 he first entered the Bundestag via the Hesse state list, later as a direct candidate for the Hanau constituency. He was a member of parliament until his death.

Literature

References

1929 births
1993 deaths
Members of the Bundestag for Hesse
Members of the Bundestag 1990–1994
Members of the Bundestag 1987–1990
Members of the Bundestag 1983–1987
Members of the Bundestag 1980–1983
Members of the Bundestag 1976–1980
Members of the Bundestag for the Christian Democratic Union of Germany